The Academy Award for Best Actor is an award presented annually by the Academy of Motion Picture Arts and Sciences (AMPAS). It is given to an actor who has delivered an outstanding performance in a leading role in a film released that year. The award is traditionally presented by the previous year's Best Actress winner.

The 1st Academy Awards were held in 1929 with Emil Jannings receiving the award for his roles in The Last Command (1928) and The Way of All Flesh (1927). Currently, nominees are determined by single transferable vote within the actors branch of AMPAS; winners are selected by a plurality vote from the entire eligible voting members of the Academy.
	 	
In the first three years of the awards, actors were nominated as the best in their categories. At that time, all of their work during the qualifying period (as many as three films, in some cases) was listed after the award. During the third ceremony in 1930, only one of those films was cited in each winner's final award, even though each of the acting winners had two films following their names on the ballots. The following year, this system was replaced by the current system in which an actor is nominated for a specific performance in a single film. Starting with the ninth ceremony in 1937, the category was officially limited to five nominations per year.
	 
Since its inception, the award has been given to 85 actors. Daniel Day-Lewis has won the award a record three times. Spencer Tracy and Laurence Olivier were nominated a record nine times. Peter O'Toole is the most nominated actor in this category without a single win. James Dean is the only actor posthumously nominated more than once. Peter Finch is the only posthumous winner, for Network (1976). Italian actor Roberto Benigni gave the first winning non-English performance in Life Is Beautiful (1997). At 29, Adrien Brody of The Pianist (2002) is the youngest winner, and Anthony Hopkins, 83, is the oldest, for playing Anthony in The Father (2020). As of the 95th Academy Awards, Brendan Fraser is the most recent winner for his portrayal of Charlie in The Whale, in which he became the first Canadian actor to win.

Winners and nominees
In the following table, the years are listed as per Academy convention, and generally correspond to the year of film release in Los Angeles County; the ceremonies are always held the following year. For the first five ceremonies, the eligibility period spanned twelve months, from August 1 to July 31. For the 6th ceremony held in 1934, the eligibility period lasted from August 1, 1932, to December 31, 1933. Since the 7th ceremony held in 1935, the period of eligibility became the full previous calendar year from January 1 to December 31.

1920s

1930s

1940s

1950s

1960s

1970s

1980s

1990s

2000s

2010s

2020s

Multiple awards and nominations

The following individuals received two or more Best Actor awards:

The following individuals received four or more Best Actor nominations:

Age superlatives

See also
 All Academy Award acting nominees
 BAFTA Award for Best Actor in a Leading Role
 Critics' Choice Movie Award for Best Actor
 Golden Globe Award for Best Actor – Motion Picture Drama
 Golden Globe Award for Best Actor – Motion Picture Musical or Comedy
 Independent Spirit Award for Best Male Lead
 Screen Actors Guild Award for Outstanding Performance by a Male Actor in a Leading Role

Notes

A: According to longstanding Hollywood legend, reported by Susan Orlean, Rin Tin Tin actually received the most Best Actor votes, but the Academy (not wishing to give the first award to a dog) refactored the votes to ensure that Jannings won.
B: Rules at the time of the first three ceremonies allowed for a performer to receive a single nomination which could honor their work in more than one film. George Arliss, Maurice Chevalier, and Ronald Colman were all nominated for two different roles in the same category. Current Academy rules forbid this from happening. No official reason was ever given as to why Arliss won the award for only one of the two films he was listed for.
C: Fredric March received one more vote than Wallace Beery. Academy rules at that time considered such a close margin to be a tie, so both March and Beery received the award. Under current Academy rules, dual awards are given only for exact ties.

References

Bibliography

External links

 Oscars.org (official Academy site)
 The Academy Awards Database (official site)
 Oscar.com (official ceremony promotional site)

Academy Awards
 
Film awards for lead actor